The Western Collegiate Hockey Association gives awards at the conclusion of each season. The current awards include Player of the Year, Outstanding Student-Athlete of the Year, Defensive Player of the Year, Rookie of the Year, and Coach of the Year, as well as the league leaders in points scoring and goaltending. In addition, several WCHA players have won the Patty Kazmaier Award for the nation's best women's college hockey player.

Past winners have included numerous Olympic medalists and players in professional hockey leagues in North America and Europe. Minnesota is the most successful team, with 60 award winners and statistical leaders. All current members of the conference are represented.

Hannah Brandt of Minnesota won five awards over her career; she was named Rookie of the Year, led the league in scoring twice, and was named Player of the Year twice.  Seven other players have won three or more awards over their careers. No player has won more than two awards in a single season; eleven players have achieved this feat.  Mark Johnson of Wisconsin has been named Coach of the Year nine times.

Patty Kazmaier Award

The Patty Kazmaier Award has been awarded annually since 1998 to the top player in NCAA Division I women's hockey. In that time, 8 players have won the award while playing for WCHA schools.

Winners by school

Player of the Year

Winners by school

Student-Athlete of the Year

Winners by school

Defensive Player of the Year

Winners by school

Rookie of the Year

Winners by school

Coach of the Year

Winners by school

Statistical leaders

Scoring champion

Winners by school

Goaltending champion

Winners by school

Team of the Decade
In 2009, to commemorate the tenth year of women's play, the WCHA chose the top ten players of the decade.

Sources

References

Awards, women's
College ice hockey trophies and awards in the United States